A major aspect of Donald Trump's presidential election campaigns, in both his 2016 campaign, and his 2020 campaign, are his prominent and frequent political rallies. Below are musicians who have voiced opposition to their music being used by Trump at his rallies, or for other political purposes, and the actions they took in response to their music’s use.

Adele
Adele stated that Trump did not have permission to use her songs "Rolling in the Deep" or "Skyfall" at Trump political rallies in 2016, and requested that her music not be used in any political campaigning. Adele later endorsed Trump's 2016 opponent, Hillary Clinton, instead.

Aerosmith
Steven Tyler of Aerosmith demanded that Trump stop playing "Dream On" at Trump's political rallies in 2015. In 2018, it happened again, with Tyler demanding Trump stop using another song, "Living on the Edge", at his political rallies. A cease and desist letter was sent both times.

The Beatles
George Harrison's estate denounced the use of the Harrison-written Beatles song "Here Comes the Sun" after the Trump campaign used the song to introduce Ivanka Trump at the 2016 Republican National Convention. The estate noted that Trump did not have permission to use this song, but that they would consider allowing him to use the Harrison song "Beware of Darkness".

Bruce Springsteen
Bruce Springsteen opposed Trump using his song "Born in the U.S.A." at Trump's political rallies in 2016. Rather than take legal action, he openly announced his support for Trump's opponent, Hillary Clinton, and even campaigned in support of her. As a result, the song would instead get booed every time Trump would play it at rallies from that point on.

Creedence Clearwater Revival
John Fogerty, the frontman for the band Creedence Clearwater Revival, has opposed Trump's use of the band's song "Fortunate Son". In October 2020, Fogerty announced he was sending a cease-and-desist letter to Trump, saying that Trump "is using my words and my voice to portray a message that I do not endorse". Fogerty noted that it was quite the opposite - the song's lyrics were meant as a critique of how wealthy people are unfairly able to avoid the draft or pay their share of taxes. Later on, he openly endorsed Trump's 2020 challenger, Joe Biden by launching his own TikTok account following Trump's defiance of the cease and desist order over usage of his song, "Fortunate Son".

Eddy Grant
Eddy Grant issued a copyright complaint over Trump's use of his song "Electric Avenue" in a political video he tweeted. The video was taken down, and a lawsuit and cease and desist followed.

Elton John
Elton John has opposed the use of his songs "Rocket Man" and "Tiny Dancer" at Trump political rallies in 2016. John noted that while their political views were very different, it was not personal. He believed that, as a British musician, his music had no place in US politics at all, and that someone like Ted Nugent was more appropriate.

Everlast
Everlast, the House of Pain rapper issued a cease and desist order over Trump's use of his song, Jump Around during his campaign rallies, and he launched a profanity-laced tirade against him.

Guns N' Roses
Axl Rose opposed the use of Guns N' Roses cover of the Paul McCartney and Wings song "Live and Let Die" in a meatpacking plant where Trump refused to take the COVID-19 pandemic precaution of wearing a mask. In response, Rose created shirts with the phrase "Live N’ Let Die With COVID 45", with all proceeds going to the MusiCares charity.

Isaac Hayes
On May 28, 2022, the family of Isaac Hayes blasted Trump for using the Sam & Dave song Hold On, I'm Coming at a National Rifle Association convention: "The estate and family of Isaac Hayes DID NOT approve and would NEVER approve the use of “Hold on I’m coming” by Sam and Dave by Donald Trump at this weekends @NRA convention. Our condolences go out to the victims and families of #Uvalde and mass shooting victims everywhere." Song co-writer David Porter also objected to the use of the song, stating on Twitter, "Someone shared with me Donald Trump used the song “Hold On I’m Coming” for a speaking appearance of his. Hell to the No! I did Not and would NOT approve of them using the song for any of his purposes! I also know Isaac’s estate wouldn’t approve as well! #Memphis #Music #Grammy"

Leonard Cohen
On August 28, 2020, the Cohen estate issued a statement criticizing Trump's unauthorized use of Leonard Cohen's "Hallelujah" at the Republican National Convention. They said they specifically rejected permission for its use, and would have only realistically considered approving Cohen's song "You Want It Darker".

Linkin Park
On July 18, 2020, Trump retweeted a fan-made re-election campaign video ad featuring a cover of Linkin Park's "In the End". Twitter received a Digital Millennium Copyright Act notice from the band's management company, Machine Shop Entertainment, and the video was pulled. Linkin Park followed up with a response, "Linkin Park did not and does not endorse Trump, nor authorize his organization to use any of our music. A cease and desist has been issued." The late lead singer, Chester Bennington, had before called Trump a "greater threat to the USA than terrorism."

Luciano Pavarotti
Family members of Italian opera singer Luciano Pavarotti protested the use of his recording of "Nessun Dorma" at Trump's rallies (which ends with the chant "I will win".) Pavarotti's widow and three daughters objected, stating that Trump's views on immigration were incompatible with Pavarotti's efforts as United Nations Messenger of Peace, which had raised large amounts of money for the support of immigrants and refugees.

Neil Young
Neil Young has indicated multiple times that he does not approve of the use of his song "Rockin' in the Free World" at Trump rallies, which has been done since 2015. Young conceded he had no legal grounds to oppose the song's use, but in 2020 he wrote a scathing open letter directed at Trump that stated: "Every time 'Rockin’ in the Free World' or one of my songs is played at your rallies, I hope you hear my voice. Remember it is the voice of a tax-paying U.S. citizen who does not support you. Me." He later objected to the use of the song in Trump's speech at Mount Rushmore on the Fourth of July of the same year.

Nickelback
Nickelback indicated that they did not support Trump's use of their song "Photograph". When Trump tweeted a doctored version of the song and music video on Twitter, the band's record label, Warner Music Group, issued a copyright claim, leading to the video being taken down. Sales of the real version of the song jumped over 500% in the days afterwards despite the takedown.

Nico Vega
Nico Vega criticized a "fight for Trump" video, shared by President Donald Trump on twitter 20 December 2020, for using their song "Beast". "To be clear, Nico Vega does not support the use of our song "Beast" in Trump's recent video, We have love and empathy for all people of all backgrounds, races and beliefs, and we feel sick how all Americans' fears and vulnerabilities have been exploited over the last four years, We will not participate in a form of propaganda that pits Americans against one another." On December 23, 2020 Billboard Magazine reported that Nico Vega dropped a "Cease and Desis" Playlist on Spotify which listed all the songs and bands who had opposed Trump's use of their songs at rallies or in campaign videos.

Panic! at the Disco
Brendon Urie of Panic! at the Disco demanded that Trump stop using his song "High Hopes" at Trump's political rallies in 2020, releasing a brief statement of "Donald Trump represents nothing we stand for...Dear Trump Campaign, F--- you. You're not invited. Stop playing my song. No thanks, Brendon Urie, Panic! At The Disco & company".

Pharrell Williams
Pharrell Williams opposed Trump's playing of his song "Happy" at rallies, including one held just hours after the 2018 Pittsburgh synagogue shooting. Williams' legal team threatened legal action, claiming its use without permission copyright and trademark infringement.

Phil Collins
Phil Collins' legal team sent a cease and desist order to Trump's campaign after the unauthorized use of "In the Air Tonight" at a rally at Des Moines, Iowa on October 14, 2020.

Prince
The estate of Prince condemned Trump's use of his song "Purple Rain" at a rally in 2019. In response, the estate shared a letter from the Trump campaign from 2018 that had promised not to use Prince's music, because they had not received the rights from the estate, showing they had official documentation of acknowledgement that they did not have the rights to play the music.

Queen
Brian May of Queen opposed Trump's use of "We Are the Champions" as his "theme song" while walking out to the Republican National Convention in 2016. He denounced its use as unauthorized, where permission was neither sought nor given, and that they were looking at taking further steps should the band's music be used any further by his campaign.

R.E.M
R.E.M has opposed the use of their music by Trump on a number of occasions. In 2015, vocalist Michael Stipe voiced opposition of "It's the End of the World as We Know It (And I Feel Fine)" at Trump rallies, stating "Do not use our music or my voice for your moronic charade of a campaign." In 2019, bassist Mike Mills spoke out about Trump's promotion of a video containing the unauthorized use of the song "Everybody Hurts", urging Twitter to take it down, which it eventually did. Later in 2020, Mills threatened legal action over using "Everybody Hurts" and "Losing My Religion" at Trump's rallies.

Rihanna
Rihanna threatened legal action against Trump for the unauthorized use of her song "Don't Stop the Music" at Trump rallies in 2018. Her legal team released a comment that Rihanna has no association or affiliation with Trump, and she did not support his campaign.

The Rolling Stones
Both Mick Jagger and Keith Richards of The Rolling Stones oppose Trump's use of the song "You Can't Always Get What You Want". The band sent him cease and desist letters about its use in 2016, and upon Trump using it again in June 2020, the band teamed up with Broadcast Music, Inc. to threaten legal action if the song is used again.

Tom Petty
The family of Tom Petty denounced Trump's use of the song "I Won't Back Down" at political rallies in 2020. The family sent the campaign a cease and desist letter, stating that the song was written for the "underdog" and "common man", and that Trump did not represent either.

Village People
In June 2020 Village People frontman Victor Willis asked that Trump no longer use any of his music at his rallies, particularly the songs "Macho Man" and "Y.M.C.A."

After a cease-and-desist order by Willis, usage continued. Scorpio Music, Village People's label, are considering legal action against Trump for using "Y.M.C.A." at his rallies.

The White Stripes
Following a political ad for the Trump campaign using the song "Seven Nation Army" by The White Stripes in October 2016, lead singer Jack White and his former wife and drummer, Meg White, issued a statement that they did not give permission for Trump to use their music, nor were they implying their support for him. The record label Third Man Records asked Trump not to use The White Stripes, or any of Third Man Records material for his rallies. In the weeks following, they also released merchandise referencing their final studio album Icky Thump, renaming it "Icky Trump", and including altered lyrics related to the ideologies of Trump and his supporters.

See also
Donald Trump in music

References

Trump administration controversies
Lists of musicians
Music controversies